Frans Rijckhals, or François Ryckhals (3 May 1609, Middelburg - 29 July 1647, Middelburg) was a Dutch painter and designer. His works combine genre scenes with still-lifes.

Biography
He was probably a pupil of Pieter de Bloot. After working in his hometown, he went to Dordrecht from 1633 to 1634. He returned to Middelburg in 1638 and lived there until his death. In 1640, he and David Teniers the Younger worked together on a painting in Antwerp.

In 1642, he married the Burgomasters daughter and moved into their home, which is now a museum dedicated to him.

He was primarily known for his paintings of rural life, but also produced Italian-style landscapes and religious works. At the beginning of his career, he also painted animals. A large number of his works in Berlin, Saint Petersburg and Budapest were destroyed during World War II. Only twenty of his works are known to exist.

He was a follower of Willem Buytewech and Aelbert Cuyp and was influenced by Adriaen van de Venne. In turn, he influenced Philips Angel I. Some of his still-lifes were attributed to Frans Hals the Younger, due to a mistaken interpretation of his convoluted monogram. In fact, no works by Hals have been identified with any certainty.

Among his pupils were Laurens Bernards (c.1630-1676) and, possibly, Willem Kalf.

References

External links

 More works by Rijckhals @ ArtNet

1609 births
1647 deaths
Dutch painters
Dutch genre painters
Dutch still life painters